The Voltigeurs de Québec Armoury, formerly Grande-Allée Armoury  (or simply Manège militaire), was built as a Gothic Revival drill hall for the infantry regiment Les Voltigeurs de Québec in Quebec City, Quebec, Canada. Designed by architect Eugène-Étienne Taché and constructed between 1885 and 1888, it is a National Historic Site.

Partially destroyed by fire in 2008, the armoury was then rebuilt and reopened in May 2018.

History

In the Canadian Forces, an armoury is a place where a reserve unit trains, meets, and parades.

Fire

The Voltigeurs de Québec Armoury was severely damaged by a fire on April 4, 2008.  All but a rear wall and turrets beside the front door were burned. Les Voltigeurs de Québec Museum in the amoury which housed various artifacts from the regiment was also lost in the fire.  However, officials estimate that 90 percent of the artifacts were saved due to the efforts of members of the regiment and local firefighters.  The armoury was to have been one of the venues for the celebration of Quebec's 400th birthday.  The armoury's wooden roof was one of the largest of its kind in Canada.

Calls were made by politicians to rebuild the armoury, to which the federal government responded in April 2008 positively by allocating $2 million for reconstruction planning.  In the fall of 2008, the regimental association launched a lawsuit against the Department of National Defence, blaming negligence on the part of the federal government for the blaze. In 2010, Intergovernmental Affairs Minister Josée Verner announced federal plans to rebuild the armoury by 2016.

Work was completed by the spring of 2018, and reopened, for use by the public, military, and other government offices.

Sculpture

"JE ME SOUVIENS" (1989) by André Gauthier, a 6’ X 9’ bronze 'haut-relief' bronze and granite wall memorial, was erected at Place George V in front of the armoury. Unveiled on November 11, 1989, the sculpture honours the memory of the soldiers from the Royal 22e Régiment (R 22e R) or Van Doos French Canadian regiment who were killed during the First and Second World Wars and the Korean War. The sculpture was inspired by A.T.C. Bastiens' painting "L'Avance" at the Canadian War Museum. The names of soldiers are inscribed in granite on the monument.

Plaque
A Historic Sites and Monuments Board of Canada plaque was erected in 1991 to commemorate the Grande Allée Drill Hall and its architectural uniqueness. The Grande Allée Drill Hall is an impressive example of a drill hall that retains its original parade square. Designed by Eugène-Étienne Taché, a Quebec public servant and architect, the stone building was completed in 1887, with an addition in 1913. The steeply pitched gable roof, conical towers and fanciful decorative details of the drill hall make it an early example of the French-inspired Château style. The use of the style here is unique among Canadian drill halls of this period and reflects the late 19th century interest in the historic French roots of the city.

See also

 List of armouries in Canada
 Military history of Canada
 History of the Canadian Army
 Canadian Forces

References

Les Voltigeurs de Québec
Armouries in Canada
Buildings and structures completed in 1888
Buildings and structures in Quebec City
Demolished buildings and structures in Canada
Gothic Revival architecture in Quebec City
Burned buildings and structures in Canada
National Historic Sites in Quebec
1888 establishments in Quebec